The Lounge may refer to:

 The Lounge (radio network), an adult standards radio format 
 The members lounge of Virgin Australia, an airline